Transamerican Love Story is an American reality dating show in which suitors woo transgender woman Calpernia Addams. Addams chooses a suitor by process of elimination. When the show first aired, viewers could vote their preferences online, but it was Addams who chose whom to eliminate. Calpernia is accompanied by her friend Andrea James; each episode is hosted by comedian Alec Mapa.

Transamerican Love Story is the first reality dating show in the United States in which contestants compete for the attention and approval of a transgender woman. Logo TV, a digital cable channel with LGBT content, announced the series in November 2007, and premiered the first episode the following February. The series finale aired on March 31, 2008.

Zack Rosen of the Washington Blade praised the series, describing it as "refreshing for its lack of sensationalism". Heather Havrilesky of Salon agreed, and admired Calpernia's composure in the reality show environment. In 2009, Transamerican Love Story won a GLAAD Media Award in the "Outstanding Reality Program" category, tying with I Want to Work for Diddy.

MTV Networks published the complete series on DVD in 2008. The series is also distributed on Amazon Video, and was previously distributed through Netflix, iTunes, and LOGOonline.

Overview

The show employs the competition-dating format established by The Bachelor (2002), a long-running series with numerous spin-offs and imitators. The bachelors in Transamerican Love Story are men who are "open to dating a trans woman". They lodge together in a mansion while Calpernia stays in a separate cottage on the estate. The contestants compete in group challenges, and the winners are granted time with Calpernia.

Before deciding which contestant to eliminate in the evening's ceremony, Calpernia confers with her friends Andrea James and (show host) Alec Mapa. James and Mapa have occasion to chat with the bachelors, and they share some of their insights with Calpernia. Viewers also vote their preferences online, but it is Calpernia who chooses whom to eliminate. In the elimination ceremony, Calpernia feeds a chocolate to those suitors whom she invites to stay. In the final episode, when only three suitors remain, they are given makeovers before Calpernia meets with them individually to tell each man whether it is him she has chosen.

Most of Transamerican Love Story was filmed in the Greater Los Angeles Area of Los Angeles County, California. Portions of episode six were filmed in the Western US cities of Ventura, California and Las Vegas, Nevada.

The suitors
Eight men compete in the show. They range in age from 24 to 47.

Call-out order
Contestants are arranged in the order in which Calpernia calls their names during the elimination ceremony. In episode five, no competition winner is declared. In episode six, each of the three remaining men gets a date with Calpernia. Episode seven is a clip show, and has no elimination ceremony. In episode eight, Calpernia turns down two of the three remaining suitors before declaring the remaining man the winner.

 The contestant won the competition.
 The contestant won a date with Calpernia.
 The contestant won a date with Calpernia, but was eliminated.
 The contestant was eliminated.
 The contestant was to be eliminated, but Calpernia let him stay.

Episodes

Production
Transamerican Love Story was one of three new reality television shows that Logo premiered in 2008, accompanied by Gimme Sugar and Shirts & Skins. It was produced by World of Wonder Productions with the assistance of Oh Really! Productions, a company that had recently begun producing The Big Gay Sketch Show for Logo.

After World of Wonder developed the concept for Transamerican Love Story, Logo called Calpernia Addams in the summer of 2007 to offer her the starring role, which she accepted. Addams is an actress, musician, writer, and activist from Nashville, Tennessee. She was 36 years old when the show was filmed.

Her friend, transgender activist Andrea James, co-stars in the series, and was a consulting producer. In a 2013 interview, James explains that she saw an opportunity for social progress in a program that accurately represented men who are attracted to trans women. Typically, she says, in US media trans-attracted men are stigmatized and shamed, and that can make them hate themselves—and "lead to unhealthy and even dangerous situations for trans women." "No one knows how hard it is for us to date!" Addams adds. Both Addams and James hoped the show would also undermine the media stereotype of trans women as "tragic and serious".

Transamerican Love Story was not World of Wonder's first transgender program. Their documentary series TransGeneration (2005) won a GLAAD Media Award for Outstanding Documentary in 2006, and Sex Change Hospital (2007) was a nominee for the same award in 2009. Transamerican Love Story contestant Jim Howley, who is himself transgender, appeared in the premiere episode of Sex Change Hospital.

Response and epilogue
Zack Rosen of the Washington Blade called the show "refreshing for its lack of sensationalism". Heather Havrilesky, in her review for Salon, observed: "The show’s producers (thankfully) resist the urge to throw in big, manipulative Fox-style surprises. While some of the men get freaked out by each other, Calpernia is likable and accepting and takes the whole crazy assortment of characters in stride."

"A reality dating show is… a very difficult circumstance in which to get to know someone", wrote Calpernia Addams, a few weeks after the finale aired. "I look[ed] at it as… a fun romp… rather than a deadly serious path to matrimony." The following July, Calpernia reported that she and competition-winner Shawn "had some dinners and get-togethers, but… have not continued to date". A few days later, she told an interviewer: "The amazing thing that Logo did with this was they showed trans people dating as being so normal, like it really is. I think it’s going to open it up for trans women to feel worthy of love and for guys to not be afraid to date us."

About two months after the final episode aired, Addams, Howley, Andrea James, and Alec Mapa all appeared together in the 2008 Los Angeles Pride parade. Later that summer, Jim Howley did a photo shoot with portrait photographer Eric Schwabel for a feature in The Advocate on the human body. Schwabel also photographed Addams the following February.

On June 18, 2009, a few weeks after Transamerican Love Story won a GLAAD Media Award for Outstanding Reality Program, Calpernia Addams and Andrea James debuted a short comedy film at the 33rd Frameline Film Festival in San Francisco. They had begun developing the film—called Transproofed—more than a year prior. Transproofed is the story of a trans woman, Ava, who feels unready to tell the man she's been dating that she's transgender; but when Ava's friend Joyce pressures her into hiding any evidence in her apartment that she's trans (with a long career as a showgirl), Ava feels more and more uneasy. Addams and James wrote, directed, produced, and scored the film. Addams takes the role of Ava, and James plays the role of Joyce.

GLAAD Media Award
At the 20th GLAAD Media Awards in May 2009, Transamerican Love Story tied with I Want to Work for Diddy for the GLAAD Media Award in the "Outstanding Reality Program" category. Calpernia Addams and Laverne Cox were at the awards ceremony in San Francisco to accept the honors for the respective shows.

Also in attendance was Transamerican Love Story finalist Jim Howley. He reports that when Transamerican Love Story won, he impulsively ran past the security personnel and onto the stage. After Addams' acceptance speech, he approached the lectern, introduced himself, and said a few words about transgender progress. Howley was one of the subjects of Sex Change Hospital, which was a nominee that year in the "Outstanding Documentary" category. He attended the awards ceremony with Clair Farley, a trans woman who was the subject of the 2007 documentary Red Without Blue. The couple married in 2011.

In 2016, two transgender-related series once again tied for GLAAD's "Outstanding Reality Program" award: I Am Cait (starring Caitlyn Jenner) and I Am Jazz (starring Jazz Jennings). Chris McCarthy, general manager of Logo and VH1, told Adweek in 2015 that without Transamerican Love Story and other portrayals of diverse trans issues, "there would be no I Am Cait." Said World of Wonder co-founder Randy Barbato, "We always thought our subjects were ready for prime time. Not that many people agreed with us."

Video releases
MTV Networks published the complete series in a four-disc DVD set in 2008. It is distributed online through Amazon Video, and has also been distributed through Netflix, iTunes, and LOGOonline.

See also

 There's Something About Miriam (2004) - A similar show, surrounding a trans-woman finding a male romantic partner. However, the show was much more controversial, in keeping the leads' gender status a secret.
 The Bachelorette (2003)
 A Shot at Love with Tila Tequila (2007)
 My Transsexual Summer (2011)

References

Further reading

External links
 
 
 

2008 American television series debuts
2008 American television series endings
2000s LGBT-related reality television series
Celebrity reality television series
GLAAD Media Award-winning shows
American dating and relationship reality television series
English-language television shows
Logo TV original programming
Transgender-related television shows
2000s American LGBT-related television series